Federico López Carviso (5 May 1918 – 19 February 2001) was a Cuban basketball player. He competed in the men's tournament at the 1948 Summer Olympics and the 1952 Summer Olympics.

References

1918 births
2001 deaths
Cuban men's basketball players
Olympic basketball players of Cuba
Basketball players at the 1948 Summer Olympics
Basketball players at the 1952 Summer Olympics